Marxheim is a municipality in the district of Donau-Ries in Bavaria in Germany. It lies on the river Danube.

References

Donau-Ries
Populated places on the Danube